Thelyphonoides is a monotypic genus of Thelyphonid whip scorpions, first described by Krehenwinkel, Curio, Tacud and Haupt in 2009. Its single species, Thelyphonoides panayensis is distributed in Philippines.

References 

Arachnid genera
Monotypic arachnid genera
Uropygi